The Hakone Pass, is a mountain pass located between Hakone, Kanagawa, and Kannami, Shizuoka, Japan. It is in the Hakone Mountains and its elevation, 846 meters above sea level.

General
The Hakone Pass has been an important pass that must be crossed for transportation between Kanto and Kansai, Japan's two population centers, and is described in Hakone Station of Hokusai's Fifty-three Stations of the Tōkaidō. Today, National Route 1 passes through it, although the new Tomei Expressway completely bypasses it by going via Gotenba between the Hakone Mountains and Mount Fuji.

Nearby the pass is Hakone Pass Roadside Station, owned by Hakone Town.

Transportation
National Route 1
Hakone Shindō
Ashinoko Skyline (:ja:芦ノ湖スカイライン)
Shizuoka Prefectural Route 20 (:ja:静岡県道20号)

See also   
Hakone Barrier

References

External link

Web Camera at Hakone Pass: Toward East/Lake Ashi & Toward West/Kannami (Hakone Town Tourist Association) in Japanese

Hakone, Kanagawa
Kannami, Shizuoka
Tokaido (region)
Mountain passes of Japan
Sagami Province
Suruga Province